William Sanchez may refer to:
 William Sánchez of Gascony (died 996), Duke of Gascony
 William Sánchez (volleyball) (born 1986), Dominican Republic volleyball player
 William Sanchez (lawyer) (born 1961), American lawyer and government official